Fernside is a small rural community in the Waimakariri District, New Zealand. In 1901, Fernside had (with its neighbourhood) a population of 550. As of the 2006 New Zealand census, Fernside has a population of 1491.

Demographics 

Fernside had a population of 1,326 at the 2018 New Zealand census, an increase of 102 people (8.3%) since the 2013 census, and an increase of 390 people (41.7%) since the 2006 census. There were 456 households. There were 654 males and 672 females, giving a sex ratio of 0.97 males per female. The median age was 45 years (compared with 37.4 years nationally), with 258 people (19.5%) aged under 15 years, 204 (15.4%) aged 15 to 29, 666 (50.2%) aged 30 to 64, and 195 (14.7%) aged 65 or older.

Ethnicities were 95.2% European/Pākehā, 8.6% Māori, 0.5% Pacific peoples, 1.1% Asian, and 1.6% other ethnicities (totals add to more than 100% since people could identify with multiple ethnicities).

The proportion of people born overseas was 12.4%, compared with 27.1% nationally.

Although some people objected to giving their religion, 53.6% had no religion, 36.4% were Christian, 0.2% were Hindu and 1.1% had other religions.

Of those at least 15 years old, 186 (17.4%) people had a bachelor or higher degree, and 165 (15.4%) people had no formal qualifications. The median income was $36,500, compared with $31,800 nationally. The employment status of those at least 15 was that 549 (51.4%) people were employed full-time, 228 (21.3%) were part-time, and 24 (2.2%) were unemployed.

Education
Fernside School is Fernside's only school, and was established in 1864. It is a decile 10 state co-educational full primary, with  students (as of

Climate
The average temperature in summer is 16.2, and in winter is 6.4.

References

External links

Waimakariri District
Populated places in Canterbury, New Zealand